A knit picker is a fabric tool used to remove snags from clothes and fabrics.

It has a small hook that grabs the snag, and can then be pulled through to the interior side to remove it. The hook is very fine to ensure it gets under the snag.

See also

Seam ripper

External links

Sewing equipment